Basij Expressway is Tehran eastern ringway. It is from Kolahduz Square in east to Tehran-Mashhad Highway in southeast and Azadegan Expressway (Southern Ringway).

Expressways in Tehran
Expressways in Iran